The 1971 Walker Cup, the 23rd Walker Cup Match, was played on 26 and 27 May 1971, on the Old Course at St Andrews, Scotland. The event was won by Great Britain & Ireland 13 to 11, their first win in the event since 1938.

Although Great Britain and Ireland won all the first morning foursomes, the United States won six of the eight singles and held a one point lead after the first day. The United States lead increased to two points after the second day foursomes. However Great Britain and Ireland won six of the eight singles matches to win the Walker Cup for the first time since World War II.

Format
The format for play on Wednesday and Thursday was the same. There were four matches of foursomes in the morning and eight singles matches in the afternoon. In all, 24 matches were played.

Each of the 24 matches was worth one point in the larger team competition. If a match was all square after the 18th hole extra holes were not played. Rather, each side earned ½ a point toward their team total. The team that accumulated at least 12½ points won the competition. If the two teams were tied, the previous winner would retain the trophy.

Teams
Ten players for the United States and Great Britain & Ireland participated in the event. Great Britain & Ireland had a playing captain, while the United States had a non-playing captain.

Great Britain & Ireland
 & 
Playing captain:  Michael Bonallack
 Roddy Carr
 Rodney Foster
 Charlie Green
 Warren Humphreys
 Scott Macdonald
 George Macgregor
 Geoff Marks
 David Marsh
 Hugh Stuart

United States

Captain: John M. Winters
William C. Campbell
John Farquhar
Jim Gabrielsen
Vinny Giles
Bill Hyndman
Tom Kite
Steve Melnyk
Allen Miller
Jim Simons
Lanny Wadkins

Wednesday's matches

Morning foursomes

Afternoon singles

Thursday's matches

Morning foursomes

Afternoon singles

References

Walker Cup
Golf tournaments in Scotland
Walker Cup
Walker Cup
Walker Cup